Ryan Brierley (born 12 March 1992) is a Scotland international rugby league footballer who plays as a goal-kicking  or  for the Salford Red Devils in the Betfred Super League.

He previously played for the Leigh Centurions over two separate spells in the Championship and in the Super League. Brierly has also played for the Huddersfield Giants in the top flight and the Toronto Wolfpack in the lower tiers, and spent time on loan from Toronto at the Centurions in the second tier.

Background
Brierley was born in Preston, Lancashire, England.

Club career

Early career
Brierley played his junior rugby with local club Westhoughton Lions, joining the Castleford Tigers in 2009.

Brierley quickly stepped up from the Under 18s side to the Under 20s for the 2011 season and appeared in a first team friendly for Castleford early in 2012, scoring a try against York City Knights.

Leigh Centurions
After failing to get an opportunity in the first team with Castleford, Brierley joined Leigh Centurions. Brierley's first appearance for the club came on Saturday 7 January 2012 when he scored two tries in a friendly victory away to Super League neighbours Salford City Reds.

He became a prolific try-scorer at the club, finishing as the club's top try-scorer for four consecutive seasons between 2012 and 2015. He moved into the club's top 5 all-time leading try-scorers with 133 in 125 appearances following a two-try display against Bradford Bulls on 28 February 2016, which was his last match for the club.

Huddersfield
After triggering a clause in his contract, Brierley left Leigh and joined Super League club Huddersfield Giants on a four-and-a-half year contract in March 2016.

Toronto Wolfpack
Brierley signed with the Toronto Wolfpack for an undisclosed transfer fee in April 2017.

Leigh Centurions (rejoined)
After just one season with Hull KR, Brierley returned to Leigh for the 2021 season.

On 8 July 2021, it was announced that Brierley would be ruled out for an indefinite period with an eye injury.

In round 24 of the 2021 Super League season, he scored a hat-trick in Leigh's 26–18 victory over Wakefield.  It was only Leigh's second victory of the year.

Salford Red Devils
On 20 September 2021, it was reported that he had signed for Salford in the Super League

International career
Though born in England, Brierley's family is from Kilwinning in North Ayrshire, and thus he qualifies to play for Scotland at international level. He made his Scotland début in the 2016 Four Nations, scoring a try in a defeat by Australia.

Honours
Championship: 2014, 2015
League 1-champion: 2017

References

External links
Toronto Wolfpack profile
Huddersfield Giants profile
2017 RLWC profile
Scotland profile
Scotland RL profile

1992 births
Living people
Castleford Tigers players
English rugby league players
English people of Scottish descent
Huddersfield Giants players
Hull Kingston Rovers players
Leigh Leopards players
Rugby league five-eighths
Rugby league halfbacks
Rugby league players from Preston, Lancashire
Salford Red Devils players
Scotland national rugby league team players
Toronto Wolfpack players